Adolphe Nicolas (18 February 1936 – 31 March 2020) was a French geologist, specializing in tectonics and petrophysics.

Biography
Born in 1936 in Rennes, Nicolas lived in Morocco following World War II, where his father worked as a doctor for the World Health Organization. He first studied in the United States, and then completed his graduate studies at the University of Paris, studying physics and earth sciences.

In 1958, he was recruited by the École nationale supérieure des mines de Nancy, where he was a teacher and researcher. He then left for the University of Nantes, where he was appointed professor in 1968 and founded the Laboratoire de Tectonophysique (Laboratory of Tectonophysics). He taught at the École Polytechnique Feminine until his retirement in 2003. He was a professor emeritus at the University of Montpellier until his death on 31 March 2020.

Works
Etude pétrographique de la région de Raon-l'Étape-Senones (Vosges) (1960)
Le Complexe ophiolites-schistes lustrés entre Dora Maïra et Grand Paradis (Alpes piémontaises), tectonique et métamorphisme (1960)
Crystalline Plasticity and Solid State Flow in Metamorphic Rocks (1976)
Principes de tectonique (1984)
Principles of rock deformation (1987)
 
 
Structures of ophiolites and dynamics of oceanic lithosphere (1989)
 
Les montagnes sous la mer : expansion des océans et tectonique des plaques (1990)
Orogenic lherzolites and mantle processes (1991)
The mid-oceanic ridges: mountains below sea level (1995)
 
2050, rendez-vous à risques (2004)
Futur empoisonné : quels défis ? (2007)
Énergies, une pénurie au secours du climat ? (2011)
Principes de Tectonique (2018)

References

1936 births
2020 deaths
Scientists from Rennes
French geologists